Club Baloncesto Clavijo is a professional Basketball team based in Logroño, La Rioja. The team currently plays in league LEB Oro.

History
Founded in 1967, CB Clavijo started their first years playing in the provincial league and after achieving several promotions, reaches the Segunda División, third tier, in 1977. It played nine seasons, qualifying twice for the promotion playoffs to the second league, but after 1986 starts declining until 1998, when a group of former players and directors planned to take the helm of the club and to take it to the top divisions.

In 2001, Clavijo clinched the promotion to Liga EBA, where it played two seasons with former FC Barcelona player Salva Díez as part of the roster of the club.

In 2003, the club achieved a vacant berth in LEB 2, third tier, and in its debut season it clinched the Copa LEB 2 by defeating Rosalía de Castro 77–75 in the final played in Logroño.

Clavijo continued playing in LEB 2, later renamed as LEB Plata, until it clinched promotion to LEB Oro after winning their second Copa LEB Plata and winning the league with a record of 25 wins and only three losses.

In 2014, the club played for the first time ever the promotion playoffs to the Liga ACB, first division, but it was eliminated in the quarterfinals by CB Tizona. Three years later, the club relegated to LEB Plata but remained in the league after achieving a vacant place.

Sponsorship naming
Due to sponsorship reasons, the club has been known as:

Current roster

Season by season

Trophies and awards

Trophies
LEB Plata: (1)
2011
Copa LEB Plata: (2)
2004, 2011

Individual awards
All-LEB Oro Team
Mikel Uriz – 2013
Borja Arévalo – 2016
LEB Plata MVP
Stevie Johnson – 2008

Logos

External links
Official website

Basketball teams in Spain
Sport in Logroño
LEB Oro teams
Sports teams in La Rioja (Spain)